The 1966–67 FC Bayern Munich season was the club's second season in Bundesliga.

Review and events
The club won the UEFA Cup Winners' Cup in an extra time final victory against Rangers. They also won the DFB-Pokal, defeating Hamburger SV 4–0 in the final.

Match results

Legend

Bundesliga

League fixtures and results

League standings

DFB-Pokal

UEFA Cup Winners' Cup

Pre-season test game

Squad information

Squad and statistics

|}

Transfers

In

Out

Sources

FC Bayern Munich seasons
Bayern
UEFA Cup Winners' Cup-winning seasons